"The Emissary" is the twentieth episode of the second season of the American science fiction television series Star Trek: The Next Generation, the 46th episode overall, first airing on June 26, 1989.

Set in the 24th century, the series follows the adventures of the Starfleet crew of the Federation starship Enterprise-D. In this episode, the Enterprise is sent a half-Klingon, half-human emissary to help them deal with a three-quarter century-old Klingon sleeper-ship who believes they are still at war with the Federation.

This episode guest stars Suzie Plakson as the eponymous emissary, which established a romantic interest for Worf.

Writing 
The script was written by Richard Manning and Hans Beimler, originated on a story Thomas H. Calder, according to The Star Trek Encyclopedia by Okuda.

Plot
The Federation starship Enterprise, under the command of Captain Jean-Luc Picard, receives an urgent message from Starfleet Command ordering them to a set of coordinates without stating a reason. While en route, they are contacted by Admiral Gromek who informs them that the Enterprise is to rendezvous with a Federation emissary who will brief them on their mission. She refuses to disclose any details, only that Starfleet considers the mission a "top security matter".

Data reports that the emissary is being transported in a class 8 probe, an unconventional mode of travel and barely large enough to contain a person, traveling at warp 9. Picard notes the evident urgency of the mission. The Enterprise intercepts the probe and beams it aboard, and its passenger is revealed to be a half-Klingon half-human woman named K'Ehleyr. It is immediately clear that K'Ehleyr and Lt. Worf know each other, and Worf is not pleased to see her.

K'Ehleyr informs the command staff that Starfleet has detected a Klingon battlecruiser called the T'Ong, which was launched from the Klingon homeworld over 75 years ago, when the Klingons and the Federation were still at war. The crew has been in suspended animation and are about to awaken, at which point it is feared they will immediately attack the nearest Federation outpost, several of which are nearby and would not be able to adequately defend themselves. As the nearest Klingon ship is three days away, the Enterprise is to intercept them instead. Though K'Ehleyr strongly believes that any attempt to reason with the Klingons will fail, and advises that Picard plan to destroy the ship, Picard disagrees and orders the staff to come up with alternatives.

Picard orders Worf to work with K'Ehleyr over Worf's objections, as Worf concedes his reasons are purely personal. Worf and his ex-lover have a heated argument, barely managing to concentrate on their task. At Troi's suggestion K'Ehleyr goes to the holodeck to vent her frustrations, where she chooses one of Worf's exercise programs, a hand-to-hand combat simulation. Worf finds her there and joins her in the program, and invigorated and stimulated by the battle, they mate. Following tradition, Worf then starts the Klingon vow of marriage, but K'Ehleyr refuses to take the vow and storms out.

At a senior staff briefing, K'Ehleyr presents her plan to deal with the T'Ong: If they find the crew still asleep, they keep them that way until a Klingon starship can meet them in three days; if the crew is awake, they will have to destroy them. Picard is still reluctant to accept that a peaceful solution is impossible, but before they can work out an alternative plan, Data reports that they have detected the T'Ong. Data detects life signs, but is unable to determine whether or not the crew is awake. Suddenly, the T'Ong fires on the Enterprise, cloaks, and moves away. The Enterprise is able to track the older vessel even under cloak, so they set off in pursuit.

K'Ehleyr urges Picard to let the Klingons die with honor, in battle. However, Worf comes up with another option. While Picard and first officer Commander Riker position themselves out of sight, Worf and K'Ehleyr, clad in full traditional Klingon command uniforms, appear as captain and first officer of the Enterprise, informing Captain K'Temoc of the T'Ong that the war is over and ordering them to surrender. K'Temoc initially refuses, believing it to be a Federation trick, but when Worf, in typical Klingon manner, shows his resolve and threatens to destroy the T'Ong, K'Temoc grudgingly agrees.

K'Ehleyr transports to the T'Ong to begin the process of acclimating the Klingons to life in the 24th century and await the arrival of the Klingon escort that has been sent to meet them. Before departing, she admits to Worf that she was tempted to take the marriage vow with him, but felt it was not the right moment for it, and implies that their paths will cross again.

Reception
In 2017, Comic Book Resources ranked this Worf and K'Ehleyr as the ninth best romantic relationship of the Star Trek franchise up to that time, noting that they reunite in "Reunion".

That same year, Den of Geek ranked this episode as one of top 25 "must watch" episodes of Star Trek: The Next Generation. In 2017, Daily Dot recommended this as a Star Trek Klingon alien themed episode to prepare for Star Trek: Discovery, also pointing out "Reunion" as a sequel to this episode.

In 2019, Den of Geek noted this episode for featuring romantic elements. They also ranked actress Suzi Plakson, who plays K'Ehleyr in this and "Reunion" as one of the top ten guest stars on Star Trek: The Next Generation.

Notes
 This episode is the first appearance of K'Ehleyr. The character later returns in the fourth-season episode "Reunion".

References

 Star Trek The Next Generation DVD set, volume 2, disc 5, selection 4.

External links

 

 "The Emissary" rewatch by Keith R.A. DeCandido
 "Manhunt" rewatch by Zack Handlen of The A.V. Club

Star Trek: The Next Generation (season 2) episodes
1989 American television episodes
Television episodes directed by Cliff Bole